Garizat District is in Taft County, Yazd province, Iran. At the 2006 National Census, the region's population (as parts of Nir District) was 6,691 in 1,870 households. The following census in 2011 counted 6,599 people in 2,027 households, by which time two rural districts had been separated from Nir District to form Garizat District. At the latest census in 2016, the district had 4,814 inhabitants in 1,675 households.

References 

Taft County

Districts of Yazd Province

Populated places in Yazd Province

Populated places in Taft County

fa:بخش گاریزات